Kevin Lee Barry (born July 20, 1979) is a retired American football offensive tackle. He was signed by the Green Bay Packers as an undrafted free agent in 2002. He played college football at Arizona.  He is most famous for being the 6th offensive lineman in Green Bay's U-71 formation, named for Barry's uniform number.

Barry has also been a member of the Houston Texans and Florida Tuskers.

Early years
Barry attended Washington Park High School and earned three varsity letters in football.  Barry was a Two-Way Starter at OT, DT, and four in track & field as a shot put thrower.
Barry was 1996 Racine County Player of the Year (Racine Journal Times); Wisconsin State Player of the Year (Milwaukee Journal Sentinel; All-American (USA Today). He played football for Hutchinson Community College in Hutchinson, KS. Upon graduating he joined the football team at the University of Arizona.

Professional career

Green Bay Packers
Barry was signed as an undrafted free agent by the Green Bay Packers in 2002, and played there until 2006. He was released by the Packers on June 8, 2007.

Houston Texans
On July 28, 2007, he signed with the Houston Texans. Barry was waived by the Texans on December 13, 2007 without playing a game for the team.

Florida Tuskers
Barry was signed by the Florida Tuskers of the United Football League on September 9, 2009. He suffered season-ending injury to arm.

References

External links
Green Bay Packers bio

1979 births
Living people
Sportspeople from Racine, Wisconsin
Players of American football from Wisconsin
American football offensive tackles
American football offensive guards
Hutchinson Blue Dragons football players
Arizona Wildcats football players
Green Bay Packers players
Houston Texans players
Florida Tuskers players
Sportspeople from the Milwaukee metropolitan area